The Cadbury Report, titled Financial Aspects of Corporate Governance, is a report issued by "The Committee on the Financial Aspects of Corporate Governance" chaired by Sir Adrian Cadbury, chairman of Cadbury, that sets out recommendations on the arrangement of company boards and accounting systems to mitigate corporate governance risks and failures. In 1991 the London Stock Exchange set up the Cadbury committee and the report was published in draft version in May 1992. Its revised and final version was issued in December of the same year. The report's recommendations have been used to varying degrees to establish other codes such as those of the OECD, the European Union, the United States, the World Bank etc.

Background
Sridhar Arcot and Valentina Bruno in their article called "In Letter but not in Spirit: An Analysis of Corporate Governance in the UK" explain the background to the Cadbury Committee. Although wrong on the historical facts, as Robert Maxwell died on 5 November 1991 and "The Committee on the Financial Aspects of Corporate Governance" known as "The Cadbury Committee" was set up in May 1991 for other reasons than the Maxwell case, it gives an interesting reading of the situation at the time:

History lesson: Cadbury 1992
According to The National Computing Centre, 2010:

• Financial Aspects of Corporate Governance

• Division of top responsibilities:

– No one individual has powers of decision

– Majority of independent non-executive directors

– At least three non-executives on the audit committee

(oversee accounting/financial reporting)

– Majority of non-executives on the remuneration committee

– Non-executives to be selected by the whole board

See also 
 Corporate governance
 Hampel Report (1998)
 Turnbull Report (1999)
 Higgs Report (2003)
 Smith Report (2003)
 King Report on Corporate Governance
 UK Corporate Governance Code
 Treadway Commission in the United States

References

Citations

Sources 

 History lesson: Cadbury 1992 © The National Computing Centre 2010.

External links 
 Report of the Committee on the Financial Aspects of Corporate Governance (the Cadbury Report)

Corporate governance in the United Kingdom
1992 in economics
Reports on finance and business
1992 in the United Kingdom